The 13th Filipino Academy of Movie Arts and Sciences Awards Night was held 1n 1965 for the Outstanding Achievements for the year 1964. 

Geron Busabos, Ang Batang Quiapo of Emar Pictures and starred by Joseph Estrada was the most awarded  film of the 13th FAMAS Awards with 4 including the most coveted award the FAMAS Award for Best Picture.

Awards

Major Awards
Winners are listed first and highlighted with boldface.

References

External links
FAMAS Awards 

FAMAS Award
FAMAS
FAMAS